Hiram Wakefield (7 May 1837 – 25 June 1905) was a member of the Queensland Legislative Assembly.

Biography
Wakefield was born in Bristol, England, the son of James Wakefield and his wife Hannah (née Sanigar). He was educated in Bristol and after arriving in Australia in 1855 was running a successful iron importing and plumbing business in Brisbane by 1857. In 1877 he invested 2,000 pounds into the Townsville ice works.

On 29 March 1861 Wakefield married Margaret Birch (died 1898) and together had three sons and four daughters. He died in June 1905 and his funeral proceeded from the New Farm residence of his daughter to the Toowong Cemetery.

Public career
Wakefield began his political life as an alderman on the Sandgate Town Council in 1881 becoming the town's mayor in 1887, a role in which he served for two years.

In 1885, the member for Moreton in the Queensland Legislative Assembly, Thomas Macdonald-Paterson resigned after being appointed to the Queensland Legislative Council. At the ensuing by-election, Wakefield easily defeated George Raff to become the new member. He did not stand for re-election at the 1888 Queensland colonial election.

References

Members of the Queensland Legislative Assembly
1837 births
1905 deaths
Burials at Toowong Cemetery
19th-century Australian politicians